Devata is a 1978 Hindi film, directed by S. Ramanathan. It stars Sanjeev Kumar and Shabana Azmi in lead roles. This movie was remake of the Tamil film Gnana Oli, with Sivaji Ganeshan in the lead.

Synopsis
Tony, a village orphan marries his sweetheart, but loses her in childbirth. He showers all his love and devotion on his child Mary. Mary falls in love with Shekhar, a playboy, and when he refuses to marry her, Tony goes to meet him but finds him dead. Subsequently, Tony is arrested and sentenced for life but he flees from custody. Years later, when Tony returns as Tarun Kumar Gupta, Mary is delighted and relieved. Unfortunately for Tony, he must now decide whether to run away again or face arrest and imprisonment.

Cast
 Sanjeev Kumar as Tony / Tarun Kumar Gupta
 Shabana Azmi as Lily / Mary (Dual Role)
 Rakesh Roshan as George D'Costa
 Sarika as Lily (Mary's Daughter)
 Benjamin Gilani as Shekhar
 Shreeram Lagoo as Father Fernandes
 Danny Denzongpa as Inspector Lawrence D'Costa
 Asit Sen as Dr. Shambhunath
 Shubha Khote as Mrs. Shambhunath
 Dhumal as Lily's Father
 Keshto Mukherjee as Melaram

Soundtrack
The music of the film is composed by R. D. Burman, with lyrics by Gulzar.

Awards

 26th Filmfare Awards:

Won

 Best Sound Design – Ranjit Biswas

Nominated

 Best Actor – Sanjeev Kumar
 Best Supporting Actor – Danny Denzongpa

External links
 

Hindi remakes of Tamil films
1978 films
1970s Hindi-language films
Films scored by R. D. Burman
Films directed by S. Ramanathan